Alberuni's India is a book written by Persian Polymath Al-Biruni about history and culture of India. This book was translated into German and afterward to English by Eduard Sachau.

References

Al-Biruni
10th-century Arabic books
Geographical works of the medieval Islamic world
Arabic non-fiction books
Books about India